Roche Noire is a  mountain located in Alberta, Canada.

Description
The mountain is set within Jasper National Park, in the Trident Range of the Canadian Rockies. The peak is composed of sedimentary rock laid down from the Precambrian to the Jurassic periods and pushed east and over the top of younger rock during the Laramide orogeny. Precipitation runoff from Roche Noire drains into tributaries of the Miette River. Topographic relief is significant as the summit rises 1,400 meters (4,593 feet) above Meadow Creek in three kilometers (1.9 mile).

History

The mountain was named in 1916 by Morrison P. Bridgland, and the words "Roche Noire" are French, meaning "black rock", referring to the color of the summit.  Bridgland (1878–1948), was a Dominion Land Surveyor who named many peaks in Jasper Park and the Canadian Rockies. The mountain's toponym was officially adopted February 7, 1951, by the Geographical Names Board of Canada.

Climate
Based on the Köppen climate classification, Roche Noire is located in a subarctic climate zone with cold, snowy winters, and mild summers. Winter temperatures can drop below  with wind chill factors below .

See also
 
 Geography of Alberta

Gallery

References

External links
 Roche Noire (photo): Flickr
 Roche Noire: weather forecast
 Parks Canada web site: Jasper National Park

Two-thousanders of Alberta
Mountains of Jasper National Park
Canadian Rockies
Alberta's Rockies